2:22 is a 2017 science fiction thriller film directed by Paul Currie, written by Nathan Parker and Todd Stein, and starring Michiel Huisman, Teresa Palmer and Sam Reid. The film's plot involves air traffic controller Dylan Branson, who, thanks to a mysterious anomaly at 2:22, prevented the collision of two aircraft and met Sarah, whose destinies appear to be tied to the time 2:22. The film was released in theaters and on VOD on June 30, 2017.

Plot 

Dylan Branson works as an air traffic controller at John F. Kennedy International Airport; he possesses the ability to visualize constellations and patterns, and though he has a pilot's license, he has fear of flying. He had a recurring dream of a shooting occurring at Grand Central Terminal 30 years ago at 2:22 PM. While Dylan is at work, he begins hallucinating at 2:22pm, only able to break out from his fugue state just in time to prevent a collision between two planes. Following this, Dylan is suspended from work, pending a full board review.

Dylan begins to realize that the same things happen to him at the same time every day, and by 2:21 he somehow arrives at Grand Central Terminal, where - although not the same individuals - he always sees the same type of people: a businessman reading a newspaper, an older couple embracing, a party of school children, and a pregnant woman standing alone under the clock. At exactly 2:22 PM, an electrical malfunction causes the station glass to shatter.

He meets a woman named Sarah who works at an art gallery, has an ex-boyfriend named Jonas, and was a passenger on one of the planes which almost collided. Dylan and Sarah, who have the same birth-date and feel connected to each other, fall in love.

One evening Dylan attends Sarah's gallery to see an exhibition of Jonas's work, a holographic depiction of New York, which includes the interior of the Grand Central. Dylan is astonished that the holograph depicts the same events he saw in his recurring dream. He accuses Jonas of following him to create the hologram. Jonas doesn't understand Dylan's accusations, leading to a fight, ending with Sarah asking Dylan to leave.

Dylan learns through Sarah's colleague the story of a young woman, Evelyn Mills, who was killed by her lover at Grand Central Terminal. The lover also shot a policeman before he was shot and killed. Dylan finds a packet of old letters hidden in his apartment, which reveal that a man called Jake Redmond once lived in the apartment. The letters are love letters to Jake from Evelyn Mills.

Dylan tracks down Catherine, the sister of Evelyn Mills. She tells Dylan how Evelyn fell deeply in love with Jake, with whom he shared Sarah's birthday. A detective visited Evelyn to tell her that Jake was a criminal, but she refused to believe him. Catherine says that she thinks the detective, Noah Marks, was himself in love with Evelyn. Noah was the policeman who was killed by Jake at Grand Central Terminal, 30 years earlier. Catherine is wearing her dead sister's necklace, which Dylan notices is identical to the one Jonas made for Sarah.

Dylan believes the supernova which occurred on the day that Jake and Evelyn died 30 years ago (the same day Dylan and Sarah were born and what he saw  on the news before leaving for work at the airport earlier) created a “cosmic cataclysm” which means he and Sarah are destined to relive the fates of Jake and Evelyn. Dylan is convinced that if they stay together, he will kill Sarah the following day, the anniversary of the Grand Central murders. A distressed Sarah confides in Jonas, who persuades her to go away with him.

On his 30th birthday, after discovering that the same patterns he had experienced had occurred to Jake on the day he died, Dylan breaks into Jonas's studio, where he finds dozens of depictions of Sarah, revealing Jonas's obsession with her, including his empty gun case. Realizing that Jonas is planning to relive the Grand Central Terminal murders as Noah Marks, he rushes back to the terminal.

Meanwhile, at Grand Central, Jonas goes to buy tickets while Sarah waits under the clock. She begins to see the same characters that Dylan described, and it dawns on her that she is the pregnant woman under the clock. When Jonas returns, she tells him she loves Dylan and cannot leave. In a jealous rage, Jonas calls her Evelyn, and Sarah realizes that they are reliving the same fateful day. Dylan arrives and Jonas pulls a gun, first aiming at Dylan but fires at Sarah. Dylan shields Sarah from the bullet, taking the hit himself and saving her life. Jonas is then shot and killed by the arriving police officers.

It transpires that Jake did not kill Evelyn (who was herself pregnant) but that the pair of them were shot by Noah Marks, who was in love with Evelyn. Jake was framed by the police for the murders.

In the final scenes, Dylan has recovered from his wounds and now works as a pilot. He and Sarah live happily together with their baby.

Cast

 Michiel Huisman as Dylan Branson, an air traffic controller at New York's JFK Airport, who possess a unique ability to visualize patterns.
 Teresa Palmer as Sarah, a passenger on board an arriving flight during a near mid-air collision 
 Sam Reid as Jonas, Sarah's ex-boyfriend
 Duncan Ragg as Jake
 Jessica Clarke as Evelyn
 Jack Ellis as Noah
 John Waters as Bill, Dylan's boss
 Maeve Dermody as Sandy, Dylan's ex-girlfriend
 Mitchell Butel as Howard Hutton
 Remy Hii as Benny
 Richard Davies as Inky
 Kerry Armstrong as Catherine
 Simone Kessell as Serena
 Zara Michales as Ellie
 George Papura as New York Tradesman

Production

2:22 was produced by Pandemonium's Bill Mechanic, Walk The Walk Entertainment's Steve Hutensky and Lightstream Pictures' Paul Currie. Garrett Kelleher of Lightstream, David Fountain and Kel West of Flywheel Entertainment and Jackie O’Sullivan served as executive producers. Although the film is set in New York City, the actual filming location was in Fox Studios Australia and Moore Park in Sydney, Australia.

Armie Hammer was attached to the film, before Huisman took on the role.

Release
Released on June 30, 2017, 2:22 grossed $3.9 million worldwide.

Reception 
On Rotten Tomatoes the film has an approval rating of 22% based on reviews from 9 critics.

Nick Allen of RogerEbert.com wrote: "With a movie like this, it's hard to tell where the good idea ran out, as it seems to have been lost many drafts ago."
Todd Jorgenson of Cinemalogue wrote: "The many contrivances diminish the potential for emotional investment in the characters - or figuring out what's happening to them and why."
Brian Orndorf of Blu-ray.com gives the film a grade "D" and writes: "Currie can't connect the dots in a fascinating way, with the entire effort resembling more of a screenwriting exercise than a hypnotic overview of celestial guidance."

Edward Douglas of Film Journal International called the film "An intriguing exploration of fate vs. circumstance and coincidence that ends up being far better than it should be, but only if it's not taken too seriously."
Danielle Solzman of Solzy at the Movies wrote: "If Groundhog Day had been made as a thriller, it's possible that 2:22 could have been that film."

References

External links
 

2010s English-language films
2010s science fiction thriller films
American science fiction thriller films
Films set in New York City
Films shot in Sydney
Australian science fiction thriller films
2010s American films